Drushyam 2 is an Indian Telugu-language crime thriller film written and directed by Jeethu Joseph. It is a remake of his 2021 Malayalam-language film Drishyam 2 and a sequel to Drushyam (2014). The film was jointly produced by D. Suresh Babu, Antony Perumbavoor, Rajkumar Sethupathi, and Jacob K. Babu through the companies Suresh Productions, RajKumar Theatres, and Max Movies.. It stars Venkatesh, Meena, Nadhiya, Naresh, Kruthika and Esther Anil reprising their roles from first part, with Sampath Raj and Poorna as new additions. The story takes place six years after the events of Drushyam.

Drushyam 2 was released on Amazon Prime Video on 25 November 2021.

Plot 

On the night of 3 August 2014, Janardhan sees Rambabu exiting an under-construction police station (burying Varun's body at the end of Drushyam) as he flees from the authorities after murdering his brother-in-law. He attempts to apologize to his wife and hide at their home but gets arrested.

Six years later, Rambabu, Jyothi, Anju, and Anu are living semi-normally. After selling some land, Rambabu now owns a movie theatre and is producing a film of his own with renowned screenwriter Vinaya Chandra. Anju suffers from PTSD and seizures from her experience with the police. Jealous of Rambabu's wealth, the rest of the village claims Anju led Varun on and gossips about Rambabu and his family. Feeling isolated from the rest of her family, Jyothi forms a sister-like bond with her new neighbor Saritha, a government clerk, who is often abused by her alcoholic husband Sanjay, a real estate broker.

On the anniversary of Varun's death, Prabhakar, Varun's father, begs Rambabu to give him his son's remains to conduct the final rites to console Geetha, but Rambabu refuses, enraging her. Meanwhile, Anu comes home over break and invites her friends for a sleepover despite Jyothi's objections. With Rambabu remaining aloof to her concerns, Jyothi spends more time with Saritha and inadvertently discloses that Anju killed Varun. Unbeknownst to her, Sanjay and Saritha are undercover cops assigned by inspector-general N. Gowtham Sahu, who wants to avenge Geetha and the embarrassment the case gave the police, and they had bugged the house. Meanwhile, Janardhan is released from prison and sets out to earn for and restore relations with his estranged wife. After learning about Rambabu's case and a potential reward, he goes to Sahu to get the money, which Geetha and Prabhakar give him. Janardhan divulges what he saw, leading to the authorities excavating the station floor and discovering a skeleton. Rambabu, seeing this through CCTV cameras he had installed around the station, prepares for the worst.

Sahu, Geetha, and Prabhakar summon Rambabu's family for more questioning, but they maintain their alibi. However, Geetha plays a recording of Jyothi's confession to Sarita, defeating them. An enraged Geetha probes Anju about the case and triggers her fits. Desperate, Rambabu falsely confesses that he murdered Varun. With the police satisfied, the family is released, although Sahu plots to trap them all later. The next day, the police formally arrest Rambabu and place him on trial for Varun's murder. Having learned about this, Chandra goes to Sahu, Geetha, and Prabhakar and reveals Rambabu had written a movie script loosely based on the case and then published it as a novel under Chandra's name, titled Drushyam, to give the story copyright protection. Rambabu pleads not guilty and claims that the police used scenes from Drushyam as the basis of a forced confession, making them realize it was part of his scheme. Furthermore, the DNA tests reveal that the body isn't Varun's, to everyone's shock. Chandra reveals that Rambabu had created a different climax for his film: knowing his initial plan might fail, the hero immediately procures the remains of another young man who died of similar injuries by befriending the undertaker of the cemetery where the other body is buried. He keeps those remains for three years before befriending a security guard at the local morgue by promising him a role in the film. The night after the original body arrives at the morgue, the hero switches them before DNA samples are collected and burns the original body in secret.

Rambabu is released on bail due to lack of evidence and the police are temporarily prohibited from bothering the family. The judge calls Sahu to his chambers and tells him to stop pursuing the case, disclosing that unsolved cases "are not new to the system". Outside the courthouse, Chandra narrates the end of Rambabu's alternate climax to Geetha and Prabhakar - the hero would discreetly transfer the ashes to his bereaved parents and live with his sins. Simultaneously, Rambabu sends Varun's ashes anonymously to Geetha and Prabhakar with a message requesting they stop hounding his family. As Varun's father conducts the last rite, Sahu convinces Geetha to let go of her enmity, concluding that they will never win as Rambabu will do anything to protect his family. Sahu also states that Rambabu's life is punishment - he has to live in fear and always be prepared to evade the justice system. Rambabu, who was watching the proceedings from afar, solemnly leaves.

Cast 

 Venkatesh as Rambabu, a movie theatre owner and aspiring film producer
 Meena as Jyothi, Rambabu's wife; Anju and Anu's mother; a housewife
 Kruthika as Anju, Rambabu and Jyoti's college-going elder daughter
 Esther Anil as Anu, Rambabu and Jyoti's school-going younger daughter
 Sampath Raj as N. Goutham Sahu IPS - Inspector General of Police; Geetha’s friend
 Nadhiya  as Geetha Prabhakar - Varun’s mother; former Inspector General of Police
 Naresh as Prabhakar – Varun's father; Geetha's husband
 Poorna as Advocate Renuka – a defense lawyer appearing for Rambabu
 Vinay Varma as J. Prathap – Circle Inspector of Police; member of Goutham’s Investigation Team
 Suja Varunee as Saritha – Rambabu's neighbour Sanjay's wife; an undercover cop; member of Goutham's Investigation Team
 Satyam Rajesh as Sanjay – Rambabu's neighbour, Saritha's husband; an undercover cop; member of Goutham's Investigation Team
 Tanikella Bharani as Vinay Chandra – a famous screenwriter
 Shafi as Janardhan, an ex-convict sentenced of homicide
 Sirisha as Latha, Janardhan's wife
 Thagubothu Ramesh as an auto driver
 Chammak Chandra as Raju - a watchman
 Annapurna as Jyothi's mother
 Chalaki Chanti as an auto driver
 Venu Tillu as an auto driver
 Avinash as an auto driver
 Bharat Behera as an auto driver
 Naidu Gopi as Hotel Babai
 Raja Ravindra as DySP
 Tammareddy Bharadwaja as DGP
 Sammeta Gandhi as Peter – A gravedigger whom Rambabu befriends with him
 Adam Ayub as Judge of District Court
 C. V. L. Narasimha Rao as Advocate Janardhan – The public prosecutor appearing for police
 Gautham Raju as Somaraju
 Rajshri Nair as Doctor

Production 
Following the success of Drishyam 2 in February 2021, director Jeethu Joseph announced its Telugu remake, serving as the sequel to Drushyam (2014) which would be directed by himself. The film was formally launched on 1 March 2021 with a puja ceremony in Hyderabad. The film was jointly produced by D. Suresh Babu under Suresh Productions, Antony Perumbavoor and Jacob K. Babu under Max Movies, and Rajkumar Sethupathi under Rajkumar Theatres.

Venkatesh, Meena, Nadhiya, Naresh, Kruthika Jayakumar, and Esther Anil were confirmed to reprise their roles from Drushyam. Poorna was cast in an undisclosed role. Sampath Raj is playing the role of the IPS officer which was portrayed by Murali Gopy in Drishyam 2.

Principal photography of the film commenced on 5 March 2021 in Hyderabad with Venkatesh on the sets. Meena joined the production on 16 March. The final shooting schedule took place in Kerala. Principal photography wrapped in April 2021, after 50 days of shoot. The cinematography was by Satheesh Kurup.

Music
Anup Rubens composed songs and film score for the film.The music album consists of only one song title
"Inka Ennaallu" were penned by Chandrabose and sung by Shreya Ghoshal and released on 22 November 2021 by Suresh Productions Music.

Release 
In May 2021, owing to the COVID-19 pandemic, the makers planned a direct OTT release for the film just like the original Malayalam film Drishyam 2. It was finally premiered on Amazon Prime Video on 25 November 2021.

Reception
Sangeetha Devi Dundoo of The Hindu praised Jeetu's work and also the actors' work by stating: "With the remake remaining unflinchingly loyal to the original, the onus to make it worthwhile for those who know the story, falls on the shoulders of the actors." Writing for Koimoi, Shubam Kulkarni gave a mixed review by stating that "Don’t take me as a hater of remakes. There are amazing ones out there. But a point to point copy of a movie in an era where people are fast adapting to subtitles makes no sense to me". Neeshita Nyayapati of The Times of India gave a rating of 3.5 out of 5 and cited as a "worthy sequel" to a "stellar film". She further praised film's direction, acting by the ensemble cast, cinematography, screenplay and the film score.

References

External links 

2020s Telugu-language films
2021 crime thriller films
2021 films
2021 thriller drama films
Aashirvad Cinemas films
Amazon Prime Video original films
Fictional portrayals of the Andhra Pradesh Police
Films about families
Films not released in theaters due to the COVID-19 pandemic
Films set in Andhra Pradesh
Films shot in Andhra Pradesh
Films shot in Hyderabad, India
Indian sequel films
Indian thriller drama films
Suresh Productions films
Telugu remakes of Malayalam films
Works about unsolved crimes